Teakerne Arm Provincial Park is a provincial park in British Columbia, Canada, located on the north shore of Teakerne Arm on West Redonda Island in the Discovery Islands archipelago, to the northeast of the city of Campbell River, Canada.

References

Provincial Parks of the Discovery Islands
Provincial parks of British Columbia